Epilobium obcordatum is a species of perennial plant in the evening-primrose family (Onagraceae), known by the common name rockfringe willowherb and rock fringe. This small perennial is clumpy to mat-forming and spreads from a woody caudex, especially in nooks between rocks. It has stems lined with oval or rounded leaves which spread parallel to the ground or ascend somewhat. At the tips of the thin stems are flowers each with four petals. The petals are magenta to purple, rounded and notched, often in a perfect heart shape, and are one or two centimeters long. The glandular, club-like, ridged fruit is a capsule two to four centimeters long growing on a short stalk.

References

External links
Jepson Manual Treatment
Photo gallery

obcordatum